The Quebec Sons of Ireland were a senior amateur ice hockey team from Quebec City that played in various ice hockey leagues in Canada from 1915–1927, such as the Quebec City Hockey League, Quebec Provincial Hockey League and the Eastern Canada Amateur Hockey League.

History
The team became a member of the Quebec City Hockey League for the 1915–16 season, and was managed and coached by Emmett McDonald, a younger brother of Quebec Bulldogs forward Jack McDonald. With Emmett McDonald as coach the team would capture the Art Ross Cup in 1916, an amateur challenge trophy for teams not eligible to compete for the Allan Cup. McDonald died of pneumonia on February 28, 1919 while serving with the Canadian Expeditionary Force in Siberia. Another brother, Billy McDonald, played defense on the team. 

Quebec Sons of Ireland defended the Art Ross Cup in 1916–17 by defeating the Montreal Stars, Loyola College and Montreal Vickers. Next season Sons of Ireland lost the Art Ross Cup to Montreal Hochelaga on March 6, 1918 losing 4 goals to 0.

Notable players
George McNaughton
Art Gagné
George Carey
Johnny Gagnon
Herb Rhéaume
Mike Neville
Leo Gaudreault
Frank Brophy

References

Notes

External links
Teams – Quebec Sons of Ireland Hockey Hall of Fame (hhof.com). Retrieved 2020-11-02.

Ice hockey teams in Quebec
Defunct ice hockey teams in Canada
Diaspora sports clubs in Canada
Irish-Canadian culture